The Be Five was a band composed of actors from the television show Babylon 5. It was masterminded by Bill Mumy and made up of Mumy, Andreas Katsulas, Mira Furlan, Peter Jurasik and Claudia Christian, with Patricia Tallman singing backup in two tracks.  Mumy wrote or co-wrote all tracks, and each performer was given the lead vocal in two songs.

Trying to Forget
The band's only album, Trying to Forget, was originally released in 1998 as a limited edition of 2500 copies and only available at conventions at which one of the performers were present. In July 1999 it was put on general release and a twelve-page booklet was added. The album was re-released in 2012 by Renaissance Digital with two new tracks "My Brother's Moved On" (dedicated to the memory of Andreas Katsulas, Richard Biggs, Jeff Conaway, Michael O’Hare and Tim Choate) and "Last Train".

Track listing
All songs written by Bill Mumy except where noted.
"Tell Me How" (ensemble) (Mumy, Gary Stockdale)
"If You Want Candy" (features Claudia Christian)
"When You Were by My Side" (features Peter Jurasik)
"I Don't Know Who You Are" (features Mira Furlan) (Mumy, Mira Furlan)
"High on the Strength of Your Love" (features Bill Mumy)
"How Was I to Know" (features Andreas Katsulas)
"Lovely in Loveland" (features Claudia Christian) (Mumy, Robert Haimer)
"Might Be You" (features Bill Mumy)
"The Touch of Your Hand" (features Mira Furlan)
"Can't Imagine Blues" (features Andreas Katsulas)
"Put It on Down" (features Peter Jurasik) (Mumy, Peter Jurasik)
"It's Just a TV Show" (ensemble)
"My Brother’s Moved On" (new recording - 2013)
"Last Train" (new recording - 2013)

Performers
 Steve Lukather   – guitars (tracks 2, 6, 11, 12)
 Greg "Harpo" Hilfman – keyboards
 Jennifer Condos      – bass
 Christopher Ross     – drums, percussion
 Bill Mumy            – vocals
 Claudia Christian    – vocals
 Patricia Tallman     – background vocals
 Mira Furlan          – vocals
 Andreas Katsulas     – vocals
 George Englund       – saxophone
 Peter Jurasik        – vocals

References

Babylon 5
American musical groups